Georgas Freidgeimas (born 10 August 1987) is a retired Lithuanian footballer who played as a centre-back.

Career

Club
Defender joined Žalgiris before 2011 season and spent 7 seasons in the club. On 8 February 2016, he was loaned out to Irtysh Pavlodar in the Kazakhstan Premier League.

On 15 June 2017, Freidgeimas signed for FC Okzhetpes. On 21 January 2018, he came back to Žalgiris. After 2019 season he left Žalgiris, and joined FC Vilniaus Vytis as a free agent.

Coaching career
After a spell at Lithuanian amateur club FC Vilniaus Vytis, Freidgeimas retired as a player at the end of 2020. But already in September 2020, he was hired as a athletic coach at Baltijos Futbolo Akademija.

In February 2021, Freidgeimas also became responsible for all athletic training in the Lithuanian Football Federation, focusing mainly on work with youth teams, but also with the senior team.

References

External links
 
 

Living people
1987 births
Lithuanian footballers
Association football defenders
Lithuania international footballers
Lithuanian expatriate footballers
FC Vilnius players
ŁKS Łódź players
FK Vėtra players
FC Šiauliai players
FK Žalgiris players
FC Irtysh Pavlodar players
FC Okzhetpes players
A Lyga players
Ekstraklasa players
Kazakhstan Premier League players
Expatriate footballers in Poland
Lithuanian expatriate sportspeople in Poland
Expatriate footballers in Kazakhstan
Lithuanian expatriate sportspeople in Kazakhstan